Samuel Jerry Williams (born July 28, 1980) is a former American football linebacker. He played for the Oakland Raiders of the National Football League from 2003 to 2011. He was drafted by the Raiders in the third round of the 2003 NFL Draft. He was waived by the Oakland Raiders in the final round of roster cuts on September 3, 2011. He played college football at Fresno State.

External links
Fresno State Bulldogs bio
Oakland Raiders bio

1980 births
Living people
Sportspeople from the San Francisco Bay Area
American football linebackers
American football defensive ends
Fresno State Bulldogs football players
Oakland Raiders players
People from Clayton, California
Ed Block Courage Award recipients